James Kephart (April 22, 1842 - April 27, 1932) was an American recipient of the Medal of Honor who earned the medal in action during the American Civil War.

Biography 
Kephart was born in Venango County, Pennsylvania on April 22, 1842. He served as a private in Company C of the 13th U.S. Infantry of the Union Army during the American Civil War. He earned his medal in action at the Battle of Vicksburg, Mississippi on May 19, 1863. Kephart's medal was issued on May 13, 1899. Kephart lived in Webster City, Iowa after the war where he served on the City Board of Education. He died in Gooding, Idaho on April 27, 1932, and is now buried there in Elmwood Cemetery.

Medal of Honor Citation 
For extraordinary heroism on 19 May 1863, in action at Vicksburg, Mississippi. Private Kephart voluntarily and at the risk of his life, under a severe fire of the enemy, aided and assisted to the rear an officer who had been severely wounded and left on the field.

References 

American Civil War recipients of the Medal of Honor
United States Army Medal of Honor recipients
People from Venango County, Pennsylvania
1842 births
1932 deaths